Papuna Mosemgvdlishvili (born 27 April 1994) is a Georgian professional footballer. As of 2021, he plays for FC Tbilisi City.

References

External links 
 
 
 Profile at Slavia Mozyr website

1994 births
Living people
Footballers from Georgia (country)
Association football defenders
Expatriate footballers from Georgia (country)
Expatriate footballers in Belarus
FC Sasco players
FC Sioni Bolnisi players
FC Slavia Mozyr players
FC Gomel players
FC Merani Martvili players
FC Spartaki Tskhinvali players
FC Zugdidi players